Boakye is a surname. Notable people with the surname include:

Agyei Boakye (born 1999), Ghanaian footballer
Augustine Boakye (born 2000), Ghanaian footballer
Emmanuel Boakye (born 1985), Ghanaian footballer
Emmanuel Boakye Owusu (born 2000), Ghanaian footballer
Eric Boakye (born 1999), Ghanaian footballer
Francis Asenso-Boakye (born 1977), Ghanaian politician
Gabriel Boakye (born 1998), Canadian soccer player
George Boakye (1937–1979), Ghanaian airman and politician
Isaac Boakye (born 1981), Ghanaian footballer
Isaac Boakye (footballer, born 1984), Ghanaian footballer
Isaac Boakye (footballer, born 1997), Ghanaian footballer
Kelvin Boakye Yiadom (born 2000), Ghanaian footballer
Kofi Nti Boakye (born 1987), Ghanaian footballer
Kwasi Boakye (1827–1904), Dutch mining engineer and prince of the Ashanti Empire
Kwesi Boakye (born 1999), American actor
Lynette Yiadom Boakye (born 1977), English artist
Martin Boakye (born 1995), Italian footballer
Nana Boakye-Yiadom (journalist) (born 1983), Ghanaian journalist
Nana Boakye-Yiadom (footballer) (born 1996), English footballer
Panin Boakye (born 1995), Ghanaian footballer
Portia Boakye (born 1989), Ghanaian footballer
Richmond Boakye (born 1993), Ghanaian footballer
Thomas Boakye (born 1993), Ghanaian footballer

Surnames of Akan origin